The Maker is a 1997 American drama film written by Rand Ravich and directed by Tim Hunter. The Maker was released in the United States on October 17, 1997.

Plot
Josh (Jonathan Rhys Meyers) is a high school boy who lives with his adoptive parents and is involved in little crimes with his friends, including young lesbian Bella (Fairuza Balk). His elder brother Walter (Matthew Modine) suddenly comes back home after leaving home ten years prior when he was 18 and not being heard of all those years. Walter starts to involve Josh in various new criminal activities, including robbery.

Cast
Matthew Modine as Walter Schmeiss
Mary-Louise Parker as Officer Emily Peck
Jonathan Rhys Meyers as Josh Minnell
Fairuza Balk as Bella Sotto
Michael Madsen as Skarney
Kate McGregor-Stewart as Mother Minnell

References

External links 

1997 films
American drama films
Films directed by Tim Hunter
1997 drama films
1990s English-language films
1990s American films